Yusefabad (also Romanized as Yūsefābād) is a village in Nur Ali Beyk Rural District, in the Central District of Saveh County, Markazi Province, Iran. At the 2006 census, its population was 436, in 108 families.

References 

Populated places in Saveh County